The 2009 Air Force Falcons football team represented the United States Air Force Academy during the 2009 NCAA Division I FBS football season. Air Force competed as a member of the Mountain West Conference.  The Falcons were coached by third-year head coach Troy Calhoun. They finished the season with a record of 8–5, 5–3 in Mountain West play to finish in fourth place. They were invited to the Armed Forces Bowl where they defeated Houston.

Schedule

Roster
QB Tim Jefferson, So.

References

Air Force
Air Force Falcons football seasons
Armed Forces Bowl champion seasons
Air Force Falcons football